The Office of the National Altars was a government agency under the Court of Imperial Sacrifices during the Sui, Tang, Song, Jurchen Jin, and Yuan dynasties. Between Sui and Tang it was known as Jiaoshe Shu, and between Song and Yuan it was known as Jiaoshe Ju. Its main function was to prepare for and participate in regular rituals at major sacrificial altars and temples in the dynastic capital.

References

Government of the Yuan dynasty
Government of the Sui dynasty
Government of the Tang dynasty
Government of the Song dynasty
Government of the Jin dynasty (1115–1234)